The Dream of Gerontius, Edward Elgar's 1900 work for singers and orchestra, had to wait forty-five years for its first complete recording. Sir Henry Wood made acoustic recordings  of four extracts from The Dream of Gerontius as early as 1916, with Clara Butt as the angel, and Henry Coward's Sheffield Choir recorded a portion of the Part I "Kyrie" in the same period. Edison Bell recorded the work under Joseph Batten in abridged form in 1924 (the recording, with orchestral and choral forces considerably affected by the limitations of recording methods of the day, was swiftly rendered obsolete with the introduction of electronic recording the following year). HMV issued excerpts from two live performances conducted by Elgar in 1927, with the soloists Margaret Balfour, Steuart Wilson, Tudor Davies, Herbert Heyner and Horace Stevens; further portions of the first of those two performances, deemed unfit for publication at the time, have since been published by EMI and other companies.

There also exist fragments privately recorded by amateurs "off-air" (i.e. from live radio broadcasts), some of which have received commercial issue in recent years although none are known to exist in complete form.
They give alternative accounts of artists such as Heddle Nash, Malcolm Sargent, Adrian Boult (who all later recorded the work commercially) and Horace Stevens (who recorded the Angel of the Agony's solo under Elgar), and accounts of artists such as Astra Desmond, Muriel Brunskill, Parry Jones, and Keith Falkner, all noted for their performances of the work, and never commercially recorded singing it.

The first complete recording was made in 1945 conducted by Sargent. Since then it has received further commercial recordings as shown below.

Additionally, there exist two further accounts by Barbirolli, both live: a 1957 performance in Italy with Jon Vickers, Constance Shacklock, Marian Nowakowski, and the Coro and Orchestra Sinfonica della RAI di Roma; and a January 1959 performance in New York with Richard Lewis, Maureen Forrester, Morley Meredith, the Westminster Choir, and the New York Philharmonic Symphony Orchestra. Both were recorded off-air from broadcasts, and the RAI performance was circulated widely, though unofficially; both performances have in recent years seen legitimate commercial issue of off-air transcriptions.

The work was recorded for television in 1968 at Canterbury Cathedral. This performance featured Peter Pears, Janet Baker and John Shirley-Quirk, conducted by Sir Adrian Boult. The performance was broadcast in that same year, and received a repeat showing several years later. Long unavailable, it was released on DVD by ICA Classics in 2016 (noted above).

The work received a further television broadcast by the BBC in 1997, in celebration of St Paul's Cathedral's tercentenary, and the BBC's 75th anniversary. The performance (commercially released by NVC in 1999, noted above), under Sir Andrew Davis, featured Philip Langridge, Catherine Wyn Rogers, Alastair Miles, and the BBC Chorus and Symphony Orchestra. It was released on DVD in 2006 by Warner Music.

Critical opinion
The BBC Radio 3 feature "Building a Library" has presented comparative reviews of all available versions of The Dream of Gerontius on three occasions, and recommended as follows:

5 March 1988, reviewer, William Mann:
Sir Alexander Gibson
29 November 1997, reviewer, Michael Kennedy:
Malcolm Sargent (1945)
Sir John Barbirolli (1965)
7 October 2006, reviewer, Andrew Green:
Sir John Barbirolli (1965)
Malcolm Sargent (1945)
9 December 2017, reviewer, Mark Lowther:
Vernon Handley (Top Recommendation)
Malcolm Sargent (1945)
Sir John Barbirolli (1965)
Sir Mark Elder (2008)

The Penguin Guide to Recorded Classical Music, 2008, gave its maximum four star rating to the DVD  recording of The Dream of Gerontius conducted by Sir Andrew Davis. No audio recording received more than three stars (representing "an outstanding performance and recording"). The recordings with three stars were those conducted by Barbirolli (1965), Boult, Hickox, and Sargent (1945 and 1955).

A comparative review in Gramophone in 2003 by Andrew Farach Colton recommended the recordings by Sargent (1945), Barbirolli (1965), and Britten. In a comparative review for the Elgar Society, Walter Essex preferred the EMI Barbirolli set.

Notes and references
Notes

References

Bibliography
March, Ivan (ed). The Penguin Guide to Recorded Classical Music 2008, Penguin Books, London, 2007. 

Discographies of classical compositions
Recordings of Edward Elgar